Eduard Aleksandrovich Mikhaylov (born 2 June 1972) is a former Russian football player.

External links
 

1972 births
Living people
Soviet footballers
FC Rostov players
FC SKA Rostov-on-Don players
Russian footballers
Russian Premier League players
Place of birth missing (living people)
Association football midfielders
Association football forwards